Marita Breuer (born 20 January 1953 in Düren) is a German actress, known for her portrayal of Maria Simon born Wiegand in the Heimat series.

Biography
Breuer studied acting at the Folkwang University of the Arts. Her acting style is based on the Stanislavski method.

Her first professional acting engagement was at Gießen, after which she worked with well-known directors in prestigious theatres - her roles have included

 Petrowna in A Month in the Country by Turgenev, directed by Horst Wede (Cologne)
 The Young Lady in The Ghost Sonata by Strindberg, directed by Ernst Wendt (Cologne)
 Electra in The Oresteia by Aeschylus, staged by Hansgünther Heyme at the Aalto Theatre, Essen
 Kristin in Miss Julie by Strindberg, directed by Roswita Kemper (Düsseldorf)

From 2000 to 2005 she was part of the ensemble cast at the Aachen Theatre.

Aside from her stage work she has appeared in cinema and on television, most notably portraying Maria Simon in the first part of the Heimat Trilogy directed by Edgar Reitz.

Breuer lives in Cologne.

Filmography
 Uns reicht das nicht, dir. Jürgen Flimm, D 1978
 Rote Erde, dir. Klaus Emmerich, D 1983
 Heimat, dir. Edgar Reitz, D 1984
 Vermischte Nachrichten, dir. Alexander Kluge, D 1985/6
 Das Winterhaus, dir. Hilde Lermann, D 1987
 Die Hexe von Köln, dir. Hagen Müller-Stahl, D 1989
 Fremde, liebe Fremde, dir. Jürgen Bretzinger, D 1991
 Geboren 1999, dir. Kai Wessel, D 1992
 Tadesse - warum?, dir. Christian Baudissin, D 1994
 Weihnachten mit Willy Wuff, dir. Maria Theresia Wagner, D 1994
 Deutschlandlied, dir. Tom Toelle, D 1994/5
 Verschwinde von hier, dir. Franziska Buch, D 1999
 The Princess and the Warrior, dir. Tom Tykwer, D 2000
 Das schwangere Mädchen, dir. Bettina Woernle, D 2001
 Die Österreichische Methode, dir. Florian Mischa Böder, D 2004
 Heimat-Fragmente – Die Frauen, dir. Edgar Reitz, D 2004 (with previously unreleased scenes from Heimat, D 1984)
 24 Stunden, dir. Florian Mischa Böder, D 2005
 Flug der Störche, dir. Martin Repka, D 2006
 , dir. Felix Randau, D 2007
 Die dunkle Seite, dir. Peter Keglevic, D 2007
 Der perfekte Schwiegersohn, dir. Michael Rowitz, D 2007
 Dreibeinige Hunde, dir. Aelrun Goette, D 2008
 Für Miriam, dir. Lars Gunnar Lotz, D 2009
 Berlin 36, dir. Kaspar Heidelbach, D 2009
 This Is Love, dir. Matthias Glasner, D 2009
 , dir. , D 2009
 Home from Home, 2013

TV Series

 Tatort - , D 1984/5
 Ein Fall für zwei - Die einzige Chance, D 1988
 Tatort - Howalds Fall, D 1990
 Ein Fall für zwei - Kleiner Bruder, D 1995
 Tatort - Bombenstimmung, D 1997
 Der Fahnder - Blutiges Geld, D 1999
 Die Rosenheim-Cops - Die Leibwächter der schönen Barbara, D 2005
 Die Wache - Schatten der Vergangenheit, D 2006
 Die Sitte - Machtspiele, D 2006
 Tatort - Gebrochene Herzen, D 2006
 Großstadtrevier, D 2007
 Cologne P.D. - Guter Bruder, böser Bruder, D 2007
 Maddin in Love, D 2007
 Tatort - Borowski und die heile Welt, D 2009

Awards
 1984: Bavarian Film Awards, Best Actress for Heimat – Eine deutsche Chronik
 1985: Deutscher Darstellerpreis

References

External links
 
 Information about her films at filmportal.de (in German)

1953 births
Living people
People from Düren
German television actresses
German stage actresses
German film actresses
20th-century German actresses
21st-century German actresses